In mathematics, a V-ring is a ring R such that every simple R-module is injective. The following three conditions are equivalent:
Every simple left (resp. right) R-module is injective
The radical of every left (resp. right) R-module is zero
Every left (resp. right) ideal of R is an intersection of maximal left (resp. right) ideals of R
A commutative ring is a V-ring if and only if it is Von Neumann regular.

References

Ring theory